Carnot's theorem or Carnot's principle may refer to:

In geometry:
Carnot's theorem (inradius, circumradius), describing a property of the incircle and the circumcircle of a triangle
Carnot's theorem (conics), describing a relation between triangles and conic sections
Carnot's theorem (perpendiculars), describing a property of certain perpendiculars on triangle sides

In physics:
Carnot's theorem (thermodynamics), setting a maximum efficiency obtainable from a heat engine

See also
 Carnot cycle, in thermodynamics